The New Hampshire Fish and Game Department (NHF&G) is a department within the government of New Hampshire in the United States. The Fish and Game Department manages New Hampshire's fish, game, and aquatic plant resources.

Structure
The Department was created in 1865 to both propagate and conserve the state's fish and game. The Governor of New Hampshire appoints 11 Fish and Game Commission members; one from each of the state's ten counties, plus one from the Seacoast Region.

The Department maintains four regional offices within the state:

The Department also has a Law Enforcement Division, which operates in six districts across the state. Each district is staffed by a lieutenant, a sergeant, and several Conservation Officers (CO).

 Districts do not exactly align to county boundaries.

Wild Life Heritage Foundation of New Hampshire
In 2006, the Wildlife Heritage Foundation of New Hampshire was formed due to falling revenues from the Fish & Game Department's licenses for hunting and fishing. The foundation works with and supports the Fish and Game Department on projects and events which otherwise could not be funded. The foundation is a nonprofit 501(c)(3) organization.

Since 2017, Conservation Officers within the Fish and Game Department have been featured on the Animal Planet reality program North Woods Law. The production company for the series makes a $2,000 donation per aired episode to the Wildlife Heritage Foundation.

See also
List of State Fish and Wildlife Management Agencies in the U.S.
List of law enforcement agencies in New Hampshire

References

Further reading

External links
New Hampshire Department of Fish & Game official website
Official F&G Hunting Regulations
Official F&G Freshwater Fishing Regulations
Official F&G Saltwater Fishing Regulations

Fish and Game Department
State wildlife and natural resource agencies of the United States
1865 establishments in New Hampshire
Government agencies established in 1865